William Henry Maxwell (March 5, 1852 – May 3, 1920) was a United States educator. From 1898 to 1917, he was superintendent of public schools in New York City.

Biography
Maxwell born near the village of Stewartstown, County Tyrone, Ireland, on March 5, 1852. He comes from “an old Scotch family which settled in Ulster during the reign of Queen Elizabeth, his father, John Maxwell, being a Presbyterian clergyman.”

He was educated at the College of Belfast and Galway and at Queen's University, took his A.B. in 1872, and his A. M. in 1874. In 1874 he emigrated to the United States; and from 1882 to 1898 he superintended the Brooklyn public schools. As superintendent of the New York City Public Schools Maxwell worked to keep the march of educational facilities apace with the growth of New York City. In 1901 he was made an honorary LL.D. by Columbia University. In 1904/05 he was president of the National Education Association.

Publications
He was the author and editor of several textbooks for schools, and many of his short papers and addresses are printed in the proceedings of the N. E. A. and in educational magazines.

See also 
 Educational Review

References

1852 births
1920 deaths
People from New York City
Educators from New York City
People from County Tyrone